José Corazón Lacdan de Jesús Jr. (1 October 1924 – 21 April 1970) was a Filipino silent film actor.

Corazón de Jesús Jr. was born in October 1924 in Manila, the Philippines. He was the son of Tagalog poet José Corazón de Jesús (1894–1932) and Asuncion Lacdan (1900–1986). He had two other siblings; Teresa (1922–1963) and Rogelio (b. 1927).

He was also known as the Tagalog language tutor for Sampaguita Pictures, notably teaching actress Gloria Romero on how to deliver lines. Despite this, he never starred in any films for the studio, instead only appearing in LVN Pictures productions.

Corazón de Jesús Jr. died in April 1970 at the age of 45.

Filmography

External links

References

1924 births
1970 deaths
20th-century Filipino male actors
Filipino male silent film actors